The Bogyoke Aung San Stadium is a multi-purpose stadium, located in downtown Yangon, Myanmar. It was built as an athletic ground in 1906, which was completed in 1909 and named as Burma Athletic Association Ground, where many sports were held such as cricket, football and tennis. The  runway was constructed in 1935.

Overview
Renovated and renamed after Aung San in 1953, the 40,000 seat stadium is still the largest stadium in Myanmar and was the national stadium until the mid-1980s. The stadium was the main venue for 1961 and 1969 South East Asian Peninsular Games. While it is no longer the main venue of choice for international level competitions, the stadium is still heavily used for Myanmar National League football matches.

Aung San National Indoor Stadium, located next to the outdoor stadium, is used for indoor sports competitions.

References

Football venues in Myanmar
Athletics (track and field) venues in Myanmar
Buildings and structures in Yangon
Sport in Yangon
Multi-purpose stadiums in Myanmar
Sports venues completed in 1909
Southeast Asian Games stadiums
Southeast Asian Games athletics venues
Southeast Asian Games football venues